Charles Arthur McCool (February 27, 1853 – March 19, 1926) was a Canadian politician. He represented the riding of Nipissing in the House of Commons of Canada from 1900 to 1908. He was a member of the Liberal Party.

McCool, a lumber merchant before entering politics, was born in Chichester, Canada East (Chichester, Quebec) .

External links
 

1853 births
1926 deaths
Liberal Party of Canada MPs
Members of the House of Commons of Canada from Ontario